Defending champion Serena Williams defeated Li Na in the final, 2–6, 6–3, 6–0 to win the singles tennis title at the 2013 WTA Tour Championships. It was her record 11th title of the season, and her fourth Tour Finals singles title.

Players

Notes:
  Maria Sharapova had qualified but withdrew due to a right shoulder injury

Alternates

Draw

Finals

Red group

White group

References
General

Specific

Singles 2013
2013 WTA Tour
2013 in Turkish tennis